The Institute of Brewing and Distilling (IBD) is an industry trade association for brewers and distillers, both in the United Kingdom and internationally. The IBD had its headquarters at Clarges Street in London London until 2014 at which time the Institute moved to its current location in Curlew Street, south of the River Thames.

History
The institute can trace its roots back to 1886 when a group of ten scientists with interests in malting and brewing science formed The Laboratory Club, which later became the Institute of Brewing (IoB). In October 1906 a group of Yorkshire brewers established the Operative Brewers' Guild, which changed its name to the Brewers' Guild in 1929. The Guild and the Institute merged to form the Institute and Guild of Brewing (IGB) in 2001, which was later renamed as the Institute of Brewing and Distilling in 2005.

Publications of the IBD
The Brewer and Distiller International is a full colour monthly publication that is sent out to full IBD members.

Presidents
This list is incomplete:

Institute of Brewing

 1904-05 Charles Hagart Babington
 1905-06 Sir William Waters Butler, 1st Baronet
 1906-07 Montagu Martin Weller Baird
 1907-08 Alfred Gordon Salamon, ARSM, FIC
 1908-09 James Grimble Groves, DL, JP
 1909-10 Edwyn Frederick Barclay
 1910-11 Henry Herbert Riley-Smith
 1911-13 Alfred Chaston Chapman, FRS, FIC
 1913-15 Francis Pelham Whitbread
 1915-17 Thomas Watson Lovibond, FIC
 1917-19 Adrian John Brown, MSc, FIC, FRS
 1919-21 Sydney Oswald Nevile
 1921-23 Henry Edmund Field
 1923-24 Edward Ralph Moritz, FIC
 1924-26 Robert Valentine Reid
 1926-28 Francis Pelham Whitbread
 1928-30 Robert John Baker Storey
 1930-32 Percy Gates
 1932-34 James Stonehouse, ACGI
 1934-36 Christopher George
 1936-37 Harold Wallis Harman
 1937-38 Cecil Ernest Wells Charrington, MC
 1938-39 Thomas Edward Grant
 1939-41 Lt-Col. James Herbert Porter, CBE, DSO
 1941-43 George Thomas Cook
 1943-44 Harold Wallis Harman
 1944-45 Cecil Ernest Wells Charrington, MC
 1945-47 Walter Scott, JP
 1947-52 Maurice Vandeleur Courage
 1952-54 John Morison Inches
 1954-56 John Edmund Martineau, MA
 1956-58 George Mesnard Parsons
 1958-60 Maurice Arthur Pryor
 1960-62 John Gretton, 2nd Baron Gretton, OBE
 1962-64 Lt-Col. Francis Northey Richardson, TD, JP
 1964-66 Arthur Harold John Brook
 1966-68 Norman Bryce Smiley, MA
 1968-70 Clifford Furness Mackay
 1970-72 Prof. Anna Macgillivray MacLeod, DSc, PhD, FIBiol, FRSE
 1972-74 Ewart Agnew Boddington, MA, JP
 1974-76 Anthony John Richard Purssell, MA
 1976-78 Charles Henderson Tidbury
 1978-80 Peter Beal Hossell
 1980-82 Michael Henry van Gruisen, TD, MA
 1982-84 Michael Chalcraft
 1984-86 Norman Sydney Curtis, BSc, CChem, FRSC
 1986-88 Peter Edward Ashworth, MA
 1988-90 R. W. Ricketts
 ...
 -1994 A. L. Whitear
 1994-96 R. Summers, FIBrew
 1996-97 R. Summers, DUniv, FIBrew
 1997-98 P. A. Brookes, MA, PhD, FIBrew
 1998-99
 1999-2000 Graham Stewart 

 2000-01

Institute and Guild of Brewing
 2001-02 Adrian Gardner
 2002-03 Dr J. Andrews
 2003-04 G. Den
 2004-05 W. J. Taylor

Institute of Brewing and Distilling
 2005-07 Dr F. H. White
 2007-08 Dr D. S. Ryder
 2008-10 P. Ward
 2010-11 Alastair Kennedy
 2011-12 Donald Nelson
 2012-14 Alan Barclay
 2014-16 Prof. Charles W. Bamforth

Sources:
Up to 1926-27: "Past Presidents". Journal of the Institute of Brewing. 32:7 (December 1926). p. 6; 
Up to 1984-85: The Institute of Brewing (c. 1985). Institute of Brewing. p. 11

References

External links
Institute of Brewing and Distilling website

Alcohol industry trade associations
Beer organizations
British food and drink organisations
Business organisations based in London
Food industry trade groups based in the United Kingdom
Organisations based in the London Borough of Southwark
Organizations established in 1886
Brewing and Distilling